Margaret Essex (1775–1807) was an English composer of chamber and vocal music. Timothy Essex was her brother.

An example of her compositions is "The Butterfly", published in The first solos: songs by women composers. Volume I: high voice. from Bryn Mawr, PA: Hildegard Publishing Company, c2000.

References

1775 births
1807 deaths
English classical composers
Women classical composers